Taherabad or Tahrabad may refer to:

Fars Province

Isfahan Province
Taherabad, Kashan, a village in Kashan County
Taherabad, Natanz, a village in Natanz County

Kerman Province
Taherabad, Kerman

Kermanshah Province
Taherabad, Kangavar, a village in Kangavar County
Taherabad, Sahneh, a village in Sahneh County
Taherabad, Sonqor, a village in Sonqor County

Khuzestan Province
Taherabad, Andika, a village in Andika County
Taherabad, Lali, a village in Lali County

Mazandaran Province
Taherabad, Mazandaran, a village in Sari County

Razavi Khorasan Province
Taherabad, Chenaran, a village in Chenaran County
Taherabad-e Barbaryeha, a village in Kalat County
Taherabad-e Mian, a village in Kalat County
Taherabad-e Torkha, a village in Kalat County
Taherabad-e Torkha Jadid, a village in Kalat County
Taherabad, Mashhad, a village in Mashhad County
Taherabad, Nishapur, a village in Nishapur County
Taherabad, Torbat-e Heydarieh, a village in Torbat-e Heydarieh County

South Khorasan Province

Tehran Province
Taherabad, Tehran
Taherabad, Varamin, Tehran

West Azerbaijan Province
Taherabad, Bukan, a village in Bukan County
Taherabad, Chaypareh, a village in Chaypareh County

Zanjan Province
Taherabad, Zanjan